Grassano-Garaguso is a railway station between Grassano and Garaguso, Italy. The station is located on the Battipaglia–Metaponto railway. The train services are operated by Trenitalia.

Train services
The station is served by the following service(s):

Intercity services Rome - Naples - Salerno - Taranto
Regional services (Treno regionale) Naples - Salerno - Potenza - Metaponto - Taranto

References

This article is based upon a translation of the Italian language version as at June 2014.

Railway stations in Basilicata
Buildings and structures in the Province of Matera